This is a recap of the 1971 season for the Professional Bowlers Association (PBA) Tour.  It was the tour's 13th season, and consisted of 32 events. This marked the first season that the BPAA U.S. Open (formerly BPAA All-Star) was recognized as part of the PBA Tour.  The event was won by Mike Limongello. Limongello posted a second major tournament win in 1971 when he captured the PBA National Championship.

Don Johnson had six titles on the 1971 Tour and won the PBA Player of the Year award, which was awarded by a player vote for the first time. Johnny Petraglia nearly matched Johnson with five titles, including a run of three in a row that concluded with a victory in the Firestone Tournament of Champions.

Tournament schedule

External links
1971 Season Schedule

Professional Bowlers Association seasons
1971 in bowling